was a political party in Japan that was founded on 25 June 1976 as a breakaway from the Liberal Democratic Party (LDP).

The New Liberal Club formed a coalition government with the LDP in December 1983, with the New Liberal's president, Seiichi Tagawa, serving as the Minister of Home Affairs in the government of Prime Minister Yasuhiro Nakasone.

It rejoined the LDP on 15 August 1986.

Leaders of the New Liberal Club

Election results

House of Representatives

House of Councillors

References

 

Defunct liberal political parties
Defunct political parties in Japan
Political parties disestablished in 1986
Political parties established in 1976
1976 establishments in Japan
1986 disestablishments in Japan
Conservatism in Japan
Conservative parties in Japan
Neoliberal parties